The F.B. Henderson House is a Frank Lloyd Wright designed Prairie School home in Elmhurst, Illinois.

History
This house was one of just a few built during Wright's brief partnership with Webster Tomlinson, the only partnership Wright ever had. However, Wright remained the designing partner of the firm, with Tomlinson acting as the business manager'.

Design
The interior floor plan is similar to that of the Warren Hickox House, although the exteriors are very different. The plan of the house is also similar, in the main living spaces, to the Edwin H. Cheney House of Oak Park. The home has one large space subtly divided into library, living room, and dining room, all in-line. A large veranda off the living room overlooks the over one-half acre of landscaped grounds. The house has over 80 art glass windows, elegant woodwork, three brick fireplaces, and many built-ins.

References

 Storrer, William Allin. The Frank Lloyd Wright Companion''. University Of Chicago Press, 2006,  (S.057)

External links
 Historic American Buildings Survey/Historic American Engineering Record/Historic American Landscapes Survey
 WRIGHT ON THE MARKET: F. B. Henderson House
  Frank Lloyd Wright - Illinois (All-Wright Site Building Guide)
 Wright Studies: F.B. Henderson Residence, Elmhurst, IL (1901) (S.057)
 F.B. Henderson House on the Prairie School Traveler
 F. B. Henderson House on dgunning.com
 Photo on Arcaid

Frank Lloyd Wright buildings
Houses on the National Register of Historic Places in Illinois
Elmhurst, Illinois
National Register of Historic Places in DuPage County, Illinois
Houses in DuPage County, Illinois